Julio Sánchez Cristo is a Colombian radio personality, born 9 January 1959 in Bogotá. He is best known for his morning news, radioshow and variety show La W, in the Spanish-owned broadcasting station W Radio. The show is currently syndicated by different stations in the United States, Panama, and Spain.

Sánchez has worked in most of major mass media and is widely recognized as one of the most important journalists in Colombia. He is regarded as a keen interviewer and has been awarded all the journalism awards granted in Colombia.

Sánchez stands as the lead-in interviewer in many investigative pieces during broadcasting and then hands out to other lower profile journalists which might be the ones fully developing the stories. W Radio in Colombia and most media in particular have become the last resort for many citizens to expose abuse by different sectors of society, they might include the government, authorities and private individuals that take advantage of people with less resources. Sanchez in particular is willing to confront individuals whose actions are under moral or social scrutiny.

Radio history
Julio Sánchez begun his career at his father's broadcasting company. Sánchez intended to enter the Jorge Tadeo Lozano University, however most of his journalistic experience was shaped by his empirical approach (See Peter Jennings for other examples of empiric journalists).

Sánchez major influence comes from his professional mentor, Colombian journalist Yamid Amat, with whom he worked in Caracol Radio.

Mr. Sánchez worked with Colombian radio station Caracol Estéreo (predecessor of W Radio) hosting its morning news show Viva FM from 1991 to 1996. In 1996 he moved his show to La FM, a station owned by RCN Radio. In 2003 he came back to Caracol Radio's W Radio, which is currently owned by the Spanish group PRISA.

Morning radio show

Julio Sánchez currently hosts the influential morning show La W in Colombia's W Radio with high national and international ratings. The show is syndicated and can be heard in Venezuela, Panama, Ecuador, United States (east coast), and Spain.

References

External links
W Radio Official website
A Gallery of images of Julio Sanchez Cristo
El poder en Colombia, Dinero, 1 May 1995
La fuerza de la opinión, Semana, 6 October 2007
Facebook Fan page
Julio Sanchez on Twitter

1959 births
Living people
People from Bogotá
Colombian radio presenters